The Isaac Bartram House is a private house located at 508 Wachtel Avenue in Petoskey, Michigan. It was placed on the National Register of Historic Places in 1986.

The Isaac Bartram House is a two-story front-gable Queen Anne structure with a single story wing extending to the rear. A one-story entrance porch with a shed roof has decorative turned elements. The house is clad with clapboards, and has one-over-one windows with cornices above.

The house was constructed before 1903, and is associated with Isaac Bartram, a laborer at Darling & Beahan's seed and implement store.

References

Houses on the National Register of Historic Places in Michigan
Queen Anne architecture in Michigan
Emmet County, Michigan
Houses completed in 1903